Brunnbach may refer to:

 Brunnbach (Hagertal), a river of Tyrol, Austria
 Brunnbach (Isar), a river in Munich, Bavaria, Germany